{{DISPLAYTITLE:C6H15O3P}}
The molecular formula C6H15O3P (molar mass: 166.157 g/mol, exact mass: 166.0759 u) may refer to:

 Diisopropylphosphite
 Triethyl phosphite